Wijesinghe Sugathadasa Karunaratne (24 December 1928 – 1986) was a well-known Buddhist scholar. He was affectionately known by the Sri Lankan masses as "W. S." and as "The Don" by the academia. Karunaratne was born in Katugastota, a small village in the Kandy district in Sri Lanka.

Early years
Coming from a family of nine siblings, Karunaratne grew up in a very poor home. The household moved as his police constable father was transferred around the country during the British colonial rule of Sri Lanka. The Karunaratne family lived a meager life in dilapidated police barracks, which usually consisted of one room and kitchen unit without any other living space, running water or electricity. The children studied at night with the help of faint kerosene lamps.

Karunaratne initially attended Dharmaraja College, but had to move to different schools as his father was transferred. Karunaratne's father eventually pawned his wedding ring to pay for Karunaratne's first month at a premier boarding school in Colombo. When Karunaratne sat for the university entrance exam while attending Ananda College (the Buddhist school founded by Col. Henry Steel Olcott), he scored the highest grade nationally and won the prestigious Moulana Prize. (The prize was shared by another student who came in a close second, Felix Dias Bandaranaike the son of a wealthy, land-owning family who attended the prestigious Royal College.) This fully paid scholarship allowed Karunaratne to pursue higher education without further burdening his family.

Education
Karunaratne entered the University of Ceylon in 1948. When his father died at a young age, the burden of supporting the family fell on Karunaratne as the second-oldest male child. While pursuing his education, Karunaratne worked part-time and managed to feed the family and keep the children in school. He won numerous scholarships and obtained a Bachelor of Arts with first class honours in 1952. Karunaratne's father had wanted him to join the Ceylon Civil Service, but his professors persuaded him to become an assistant lecturer at the university's Peradeniya Campus (which became the University of Peradeniya in 1978) in the Department of Pali and Buddhist Civilization. In 1954, Karunaratne married one of his students, Indumathi Gunatillake, who eventually became an expert in Tibetan Buddhism and joined the Sri Lanka Encyclopedia of Buddhism as an assistant editor. Soon after their wedding, Karunaratne and his wife moved to London, England, where, at age 28, Karunaratne obtained his doctorate from the University of London for his thesis on "The Theory of Causality in Early Buddhism". In the same year, Karunaratne was chosen as the F. L. Woodward prizeman of the School of Oriental and African Studies.

Buddhist studies
Twelve years later, the Department of Pali and Buddhist Civilization was contemplating the establishment of a separate department of Buddhist Philosophy. In 1964, Karunaratne was selected as its first professor (over competing candidate Reverend Dr. Walpola Rahula), becoming the youngest professor of the University of Ceylon. He established and developed the new department, and taught at the Peradeniya Campus until 1973. During his last few years at Peradeniya, he also served in the capacity of the dean of the Faculty of Arts.

The university went through a transformation in the 1970s, and the Arts faculty was moved to the Vidyalankara Campus in Kelaniya. From 1973 to 1978, Professor Karunaratne continued to be the dean of the Faculty of Arts at Vidyalankara, as well as the Buddhist philosophy chair. In addition, he also served as a member of the transitional University of Sri Lanka's board of regents.

Diplomacy
In 1978, President J. R. Jayewardene invited Karunaratne to be Sri Lanka's ambassador to the United States. Karunaratne took a leave of absence from the university to accept the position in Washington, D.C. After a distinguished service as the ambassador to the United States, as well as to the United Mexican States, he returned to teaching at the Vidyalankara Campus until his death in 1986.

Oratory
Apart from his academic achievements, Karunaratne was well known throughout Sri Lanka for his remarkable ability to make public speeches on almost any given subject. He is referred to by some as the "Silver Tongue of Asia". He was well known for his intellect and the unique knowledge and memory of the Buddhist Cannon; the Tripitaka. His public-speaking sessions were often two to three hours long. While scholars were pursuing him to dig into his deep philosophical knowledge, politicians were pursuing him to make speeches on behalf of them to draw bigger crowds.

Politics
After the '1956 revolution', Karunaratne was drawn to Sri Lanka's national politics.  He became a confidant of statesman Philip Gunawardena of the Mahajana Eksath Peramuna (MEP) (English: People's United Front), and travelled throughout the country making speeches on behalf of the MEP. In the March 1960 national elections, Karunaratne contested the Kandy electorate, running against E.L Senanayake of the United National Party (UNP). Karunaratne lost the election by a few hundred votes and returned to the University.  In 1970, Karunaratne was persuaded by Dudley Senanayake to run in Senanayake's home electorate for the UNP, but he again lost by a narrow margin and returned to his academic profession. In 1978, Karunaratne accepted an invitation from J.R. Jayewardene to become the UNP's chief spokesperson. He crossed the country, making political speeches supporting Jayewardene to form the next government. The campaign was a success, and it is widely believed that Karunaratne was the chief architect of the UNP's landslide victory.

Contributions
Professor Karunaratne was equally fluent in Sinhala, Tamil and English in addition to the classical languages of Pali, Sanskrit and Latin. He read in Hindi, French, German and Burmese. He was a visiting professor in the United States in 1963, lecturing at numerous universities as a Fulbright Scholar. Prior to that, he had taught at the University of Rangoon in Burma and at other higher education institutions in Thailand. Professor Karunaratne had travelled extensively around the world in various official capacities as an expert on comparative religion. He contributed greatly to newspapers, magazines and scholarly publications on various topics. As an avid collector of rare books on Buddhism in various languages, he had compiled an extensive library.  After his death in 1986, his book collection, including extremely rare and ancient Burmese and Pali manuscripts (some written on ola leaves), was donated by his family to the Buddhist and Pali University of Sri Lanka and other higher education institutions. His widow compiled some of his writings and published five books in Sinhala and in English: Buddhism, its Religion and philosophy, The Theory of Causality in Early Buddhism, The Way of the Lotus, Bauddha Dharshanaya saha Charanaya, and Bauddha Adhyayana Shashthreeya Leekhana Sangrahaya.

Gallery

Speeches
     Addressing members of the 8th Sri Lanka Parliament
    Sara Dharma', addressing Sri Lanka Central Bank staff

See also
Sri Lankan Non Career Diplomats

External links

 http://www.pirith.org/#Karunaratne
 https://web.archive.org/web/20110718113444/http://www.worldbuddhistuniversity.com/uploads/files/e-jornal/World%20Buddhist%20Vol_5%20No_1.pdf
 http://www.maithri.com/links/articles/lotus2.htm
 https://web.archive.org/web/20070928082102/http://web.singnet.com/~chlim/yogacara.html
 http://www.answers.com/topic/ananda-college
 https://web.archive.org/web/20140224112220/http://www.buddhism.hku.hk/staff_info/ProfYKarunadasa.pdf
 http://vipassana.com/index.php
 https://web.archive.org/web/20100208160709/http://www.cmb.ac.lk/academic/institutes/pgim/ACA/BC/Anaesthesiology.htm
 http://en.wikibooks.org/wiki/Wikiversity:Department_of_Buddhist_Studies/Origins_of_Buddhism_and_the_Basic_Concepts_of_Culture
 https://web.archive.org/web/20061114104222/http://www.windhorsepublications.com/CartV2/reviews.asp?ProductID=354
 http://www.jimmycarterlibrary.org/documents/diary/1978/d060578t.pdf
 https://web.archive.org/web/20100501200624/http://www.arts.pdn.ac.lk/pali/
 https://web.archive.org/web/20061013083750/http://www.pgis.lk/newsletter/news5/index.html
 https://web.archive.org/web/20061011033724/http://www.globalnonviolence.org/docs/buddhism/chapter12.pdf
 http://herenow.org/buddrel/5thru5.3.html
 http://tamilnation.co/selfdetermination/nation/roberts.htm
 https://web.archive.org/web/20061016151141/http://www.barricksinsurance.com/buddhist_bibliography.html
 https://web.archive.org/web/20061127201747/http://www.theodeboer.com/books.php?Author=&Title=&Description=&All=&Pmin=&Pmax=&ordernr=0&srchfrm=1&catnr=29&pg=114
 http://faculty.washington.edu/kpotter/ckeyt/b.htm
 http://faculty.washington.edu/kpotter/xb.htm
 https://web.archive.org/web/20060511224208/http://www.southasiafoundation.org/saf/safdic/characteraw.asp?ch=w
 DOI.org
 http://www.oikozoe.or.kr/bbs/read.cgi?board=data&nnew=2&y_number=46
 http://taylorandfrancis.metapress.com/(gbilm445cyorjeyzhye1psad)/app/home/contribution.asp?referrer=parent&backto=issue,4,6;journal,14,15;linkingpublicationresults,1:108538,1
 https://web.archive.org/web/20061207004336/http://buddhistcc.com/books_all.htm

1928 births
1986 deaths
Academics from Kandy
Academic staff of the University of Peradeniya
Alumni of Ananda College
Alumni of Dharmaraja College
Alumni of the University of Ceylon (Peradeniya)
Alumni of the University of London
Ambassadors of Sri Lanka to Mexico
Ambassadors of Sri Lanka to the United States
Sinhalese academics
Sri Lankan Buddhists
Sri Lankan educational theorists
Mahajana Eksath Peramuna politicians